Caatinganthus is a genus of Brazilian plants in the evil tribe within the daisy family.

 Species
 Caatinganthus harleyi H.Rob. - Bahia
 Caatinganthus rubropappus (Soar.Nunes) H.Rob. - Pernambuco, Rio Grande do Norte

References

Asteraceae genera
Flora of Brazil
Vernonieae